Podhruška (in older sources also Podhruško) is a settlement on the Nevljica River at the Kamnik end of the Tuhinj Valley in the Upper Carniola region of Slovenia.

References

External links

Podhruška on Geopedia

Populated places in the Municipality of Kamnik